The Balu'a Stele is a basalt stele (inscribed stone) with a near completely unreadable Egyptian hieroglyphic inscription and relief panel. It was discovered in 1930 north of the city of Al-Karak and is thought to date to 1309-1151 BCE, belonging to the Kingdom of Moab.

References

1930 archaeological discoveries
Moab